Kenneth John Moule (26 June 1925 – 27 January 1986) was an English jazz pianist, best known as a composer and arranger.

Biography
Moule was born in Barking, Essex, the only child of Frederick and Ethal Moule. Early childhood illness, which he barely survived, left him with a cadaverous look which went well with his ridiculous sense of humour.

1940s 
Moule played piano with the Johnny Dankworth Quartet, leaving to join Oscar Rabin in October 1945. Moule worked with several bands including; Jiver Hutchinson, Bert Ambrose, Frank Weir and Ken Mackintosh (1948–50).

1950s 
During the early 1950s Moule worked with Raymonde's Orchestra (1952), again with Bert Ambrose (1953) and with Frank Weir on several occasions. In 1954 Moule formed his own septet the 'Ken Moule Seven' which was a two-tenor, baritone, trumpet and three rhythm group. He resigned from the septet in 1955 (they continued to work as the 'Ken Moule Seven'). In 1956–59 he arranged for Ted Heath's orchestra, and during this time composed the suite Jazz at Toad Hall, based on Kenneth Grahame's Wind in the Willows, which was released on Decca Records in 1958. Jazz at Toad Hall received significant critical acclaim on its initial release. He worked in Sweden (1959) and toured Europe with Kurt Weill's Band until March 1960.

1960s 
In the 1960s, Moule returned to England and worked freelance as an arranger, especially with Lionel Bart. He was the musical director for the shows Fings Ain't Wot They Used T'Be (1960–62) and Twang!! (1965–66). From 1962 he broadcast regularly with his 15 piece orchestra, entitled Ken Moule and his music. He later broadcast (and recorded) with a larger band called 'The Full Score'. His Adam's Rib Suite was recorded by the London Jazz Chamber Group in 1970; Kenny Wheeler was involved in the recording, which was issued on Ember Records. He scored Cole Porter songs for the musical Cole! performed at the Mermaid Theatre in 1974, and worked with Dankworth again around that time with his London Symphony Orchestra collaborations. He worked out of Germany for part of the 1970s, before ill health caused him to move to the warmer climate of Spain. He died in Marbella in 1986, aged 60.

TV appearances 
As well as working as the music arranger, Ken Moule appeared as Paul, the restaurant pianist, in several episodes during series 3 of the BBC's Secret Army.

Secret Army Episodes Appeared in –
 Episode 2 – Invasions (29 September 1979) – Paul (uncredited)
 Episode 3 – Revenge (6 October 1979) – Paul (uncredited)
 Episode 4 – A Safe Place (13 October 1979) – Paul (uncredited)
 Episode 5 – Ring of Rosies (20 October 1979) – Paul (uncredited)
 Episode 6 – Prisoner (27 October 1979) – Paul (uncredited)
 Episode 7 – Ambush (3 November 1979) – Paul (uncredited)
 Episode 8 – Just Light the Blue Touch Paper (10 November 1979) – Paul (uncredited)
 Episode 13 – The Execution (15 December 1979) – Paul (uncredited)

Discography

References

External links

1925 births
1986 deaths
English jazz pianists
20th-century pianists
20th-century classical musicians
20th-century English composers